Hassel T. Hicks (1896–1952) was an American architect from Welch, West Virginia.

Life and career
Hassel Thomas Hicks was born in Virginia on October 27, 1896. After graduating high school, he spent one year at the Virginia Polytechnic Institute, and four more at the Virginia Military Institute. He worked for Virginia State Highway Commission before serving in World War I. After the war, he worked for the State Road Department in Mingo County, West Virginia, in the seat of Williamson. After a year with the state, he took an architectural position with local engineer David M. Good. In 1921 he joined the office of William P. Meiring as designing partner. The firm, Meiring, Hicks & Company, lasted until Hicks opened his own office the following year, 1922.

In his time at Williamson, Hicks saw the opportunities available at Welch, the seat of McDowell County. In 1924 he moved his office there, taking over the office of local architect A. E. Wolford in the McDowell County National Bank Building. In the 1930s Hicks hired Clio A. Vecellio as his chief assistant. Vecellio would later go on to established the firm of Vecellio & Kreps in Charleston in 1945. Hicks grew to be a prominent and respected architect, and served as vice president of the West Virginia chapter of the AIA during the 1940s.

He died in Welch on January 21, 1952.

Legacy
After Hicks' death, Raymond J. Zando, his assistant since 1946, sold the practice to Martens & Son, a prominent Charleston firm. Martens kept Zando on to maintain a Welch office for the firm, a position which he held until 1959, when Martens & Son was dissolved. He moved to Charleston and founded Zando, Martin & Milstead, which would become one of the state's leading architectural firms.

Hicks was the architect of at least four buildings individually listed on the National Register of Historic Places, and at least two more contribute to listed historic districts. He designed many of West Virginia coal country's most significant buildings of the 20th century.

Works
 1926 – Kasdin Brothers Store, Main St, Kimball, West Virginia
 1926 – Rhodes Realty Building, 95–97 McDowell St, Welch, West Virginia
 1927 – World War Memorial Building, 178 One Way St, Kimball, West Virginia
 Placed on the NRHP in 1993.
 1929 – Stevens Clinic Hospital (former), 795 Virginia St, Welch, West Virginia
 1933 – Coal House, 100 E 3rd Ave, Williamson, West Virginia
 Placed on the NRHP in 1980.
 1933 – St. Peter R. C. Church, 111 Virginia Ave, Welch, West Virginia.
 Remodeled in 1969 by Zando, Martin & Milstead.
 1937 – Clinch Valley Clinic Hospital, 2949 W Front St, Richlands, Virginia
 Demolished in 1983.
 1938 – Elven C. Smith House, 210 Little Oak St, Williamson, West Virginia
 Placed on the NRHP in 2002.
 1938 – Welch High School Gymnasium, Maple Ave, Welch, West Virginia
 1940 – Municipal Parking Building, 59 McDowell St, Welch, West Virginia
 1944 – McDowell County Vocational School, 1 Stadium Dr, Welch, West Virginia
 1948 – Algoma Coal and Coke Company Store, Coke Oven Rd, Algoma, West Virginia
 Placed on the NRHP in 1992.
 1950 – First Methodist Church, 125 Virginia Ave, Welch, West Virginia

References

1896 births
1952 deaths
Architects from West Virginia
20th-century American architects
People from Welch, West Virginia
Virginia Tech alumni
Virginia Military Institute alumni